The 1936 Montana State Bobcats football team was an American football team that represented Montana State College (later renamed Montana State University) in the Rocky Mountain Conference (RMC) during the 1936 college football season. In its first season under head coach Jack Croft, the team compiled a 3–5 record (1–4 against RMC opponents) and was outscored by a total of 119 to 70. Bill Stebbins was the team captain, and Alan Oliver won the most valuable player award.

Schedule

References

Montana State
Montana State Bobcats football seasons
Montana State Bobcats football